Inside Tennis is a sports magazine that covers news from the world of tennis.  It is published 10-times a year (monthly March through October and bi-monthly November through February) in Northern California, Southern California, Nevada, and Texas.

History and profile
Inside Tennis has been in print since 1981 and has been available online since 2004. The magazine is based in Berkeley, California.
Founded by William Simons, the magazine covers the WTA and ATP as well as local events. Managing Editor is Douglas Hochmuth, Production Manager is Martin Brown.

See also

 Tennis (magazine)
 Tennis Week

References

Tennis magazines
Magazines established in 1981
Sports magazines published in the United States
Magazines published in California